Chess Super League is an online chess tournament organized by Samay Raina, ChessBase India, Nodwin Gaming. Players in the tournament, consist of some of the Top International Grandmasters, Indian Grandmasters, International Masters and Indian Junior Players, which are grouped into 6 teams. The entire event was streamed on Samay Raina's YouTube Channel.

Format 
The games will be played with a time control of 15 minutes plus a 10-second increment. The first five days will see a league stage with different pools, from which the top four teams will qualify for the playoffs.

The teams that finish first and second will play Qualifier 1, and the teams that finish 3 and 4 will play the Eliminator 1. Eliminator 2 consists of the loser of Qualifier 1 against the winner of Eliminator 1. The winner of Eliminator 2 goes to the finals to face off with the winner of Qualifier 1.

Teams (Season 1) 
The players are six top grandmasters (male and female), six top players from India (male and female), and six top Indian juniors (boys and girls). One player from each of these 6 brackets are clubbed into a team, leading to a total of 6 teams that will be spearheaded by franchise owners who will support and represent their squad throughout the league.

Results (Season 1) 
The first season was won by Zakir Khan's Pivotal Pawns at an Armageddon clash against Tanmay Bhat's Kingslayers on 17 October 2021. The finals saw a two round event with round 1 being won by The Kingslayers and Round 2 being won by Pivotal Pawns, to force a tie break between Zhansaya Abdumalik and Nana Dzagnidze which was won by the former.

Controversies 
The first season saw massive controversies being sparked.

In one of the matches, a draw was offered by Vidit Gujrathi, before move 40, which was, according to rule-book, illegal, and thus, the arbitrators awarded the win to his opponent, which sparked rage from Vidit's end for not receiving any warning.

In another instance, Hikaru Nakamura, a player in the tournament, used his phone during the game, which was deemed by the arbitrators as a use of external aid, and thus, deemed illegal, with a win being awarded to his opponent. Hikaru Nakamura, in another instance, was playing Chess.com's Titled Tuesday and Chess Super League's matches simultaneously, which was, according to the viewers, unethical for his team, and his opponent. He and his team, would later lose the matchup, which might have been a crucial turning point.

References 

Chess competitions